The aluminium halides are:

 Aluminium bromide
 Aluminium chloride
 Aluminium fluoride
 Aluminium iodide
 Aluminium monobromide
 Aluminium monochloride
 Aluminium monofluoride
 Aluminium monoiodide

Ions also exist
 aluminium tetrafluoride AlF